Michel Georges Alfred Catty (18 June 1931 – 26 January 2020), known as Michou, was a French singer, drag artist and owner of Chez Michou in Montmartre. He was born in Amiens. A local celebrity, he appeared in a cameo as himself in the 1973 film La bonne année directed by Claude Lelouch. In 1973 he also played the part of Beauchamp in the TV series Molière pour rire et pour pleurer, directed by Marcel Camus.

He was the subject of Jean Luret's documentary L'intrigant destin d’un Transformiste. In the 1980s, he was regularly invited on French TV. He was made a chevalier de la Légion d'honneur in 2005.

Biography 
With no training, he moved to Paris in the early 1950s and worked in odd jobs, then he started dealing with the night scene. He also disguised himself by imitating France Gall or Brigitte Bardot. He was the director of the Cabaret Michou, located 80 rue des Martyrs in the 18th arrondissement of the capital. He also released several singles.

Michou adopted an extravagant and kitschy clothing appearance, including famous blue glasses and a discoloured brushing. He made no secret of his homosexuality. He died at the age of 88 on 26 January 2020 in Saint-Mandé.

Discography
1972 : Si tu f'sais du tandem avec moi
1973 : Quoi mon chou ?
1974 : Plus joli qu'une fleur
1974 : Qu'est-ce qui m'attend à la rentrée ? / Le clown sur la piste
1978 : Fofolle
1978 : L'homme à femmes
1978 : Moi j'suis Michou5555666

1989 : Le bataillon de chez Michou
1989 : Les fricoteuses
1989 : Le cabaret qui défend les droits de l'homme
2001 : Michou, c'est qui ?, « chanson-biographie » for his 70th birthday.
2005 : Signé Michou
2008 : Michoumania
2011 : 80, rue des martyrs

References

1931 births
2020 deaths
People from Amiens
French male singers
Chevaliers of the Légion d'honneur
French gay artists